Steven Michael "Steve" Kemp (born 29 December 1978) is an English drummer. He was the drummer of indie rock band Hard-Fi.

Career
Originally from Lancashire, Kemp went to Carnforth High School, before he moved to London in his late teens to take a musical course. Kemp is a big fan of Liverpool F.C. and was originally a drummer for a Dj who happened to be a friend of Richard Archer. When Archer was scouting for members to be in his band, he asked Kemp to be part of it, through Kemp's link with the Dj.

In December 2007 he slammed bands such as Led Zeppelin and The Police for charging their fans £100 for tickets to their live concerts. He said "I know these old bands have a huge legacy but paying over £100 for a ticket is a joke. If it's a band you really love, of course you want to go and see them-but why should you then pay so much money for it? These rock 'n' roll dinosaurs are coming out for a last pay cheque. I don't know what they’re going to do on stage that's so special". He then joked, "I think we should split up in November, just to get back together in December. See if it makes us more famous. Maybe we could have November off and get back together in December and call it the reunion tour. The few remaining tickets will sell out in no time. It will be a winner. It will be perfect."

In an interview with ilikemusic, Kemp was asked to reflect on whether he has time to "smell the roses and enjoy the journey and reflect."

"It's weird because you don't (enjoy the moment) whilst you're doing it. You don't realise how much you're enjoying yourself sometimes. I really try and stop myself in my tracks now and say 'look what you've achieved, look what you've just done, look what you're doing'. I really try and do that, because if you don't, you're always focusing on what's next rather than what's just happened. When we played our tour in May 2006 and we did the five Brixton Academy gigs I remember at the time I was so amazingly tired and shattered I enjoyed it, but it was really hard work. Now I can look back and think what a f__ laugh. It does take a while for it to sink in before you can look back and really enjoy yourselves.

But it's all amazing. We've had two number one records. We've sold over a million records. We've achieved so much that you have to remind yourself how fantastic that all is, and if it all finished tomorrow, then I've done what I always wanted to do. But hopefully it's not going to finish tomorrow and we can continue on to bigger and better things."

References

Hard-Fi members
Living people
People from Carnforth
English rock drummers
1978 births
21st-century drummers